Motoring may refer to:

 Motoring (film), a 1927 British comedy film
 Motoring (TV series), a Canadian automotive television program (1988 to present)
 310 Motoring, an automotive customization garage based in Los Angeles, California
 Motoring.co.uk, a UK website providing tools for motorists
 AA Motoring Trust
 Best Motoring International, Japanese automobile magazine
 Driving
 motoring hood, an item of clothing
 the song Sister Christian features the famous lyric "Motoring" in its chorus
 Motoring  magazine, produced by the British Motor Company by in-house Nuffield Press

See also
 
 
 Motor (disambiguation)